Todor Slavov (22 January 1984 – 28 June 2015) was a Bulgarian rally driver.

Biography
Todor Slavov was born on 22 January 1984 in Varna, a family of Slavi (1964) and Tatyana Slavovi. His father worked in the construction field, and his mother in the system of insurance.

Completes his secondary education in Varna Mathematical School "Dr. Petar Beron". Recorded in Varna Technical University, where he studied specialty Internal combustion engines.

On 28 June 2015, Slavov was involved in a crash at Rally Tvarditsa-Elena with his Fiat Abarth Grande Punto S2000. Soon after, he died of his injuries.

Career

2003

In 2003, he began to studying race car driving with eight-time rally champion Dimitar Iliev.

2005

Todor Slavov's competitive career began in 2005 when he debuted in the mountain race "Targoviste, where he drove Opel Corsa GSi, Class N2.

His first rally championship Rally is Old Capitals in 2005, where he finished sixth. Two races later, he won his first victory in Class N2 - Rally Hebros which it climbs to second place in the overall standings for Class N2. At the end of the year, finished third in his class.

2006

In 2006, sits behind the wheel of a new car - Renault Clio Sport Class N3, with co-driver Dobromir Filipov. Especially for a better development of Slavov was creating Bulbet Rally Team. Todor won three victories in its class, the three most prestigious competitions in Bulgaria - Rally Bulgaria, Rally Hebros and rally Sliven. At the end of the year he finished in second place in N3 class.

2007

In 2007 the team purchased the latest evolution of competitive Renault Clio - Clio Sport R3. In this year Slavov achieved his best standings in the overall standings - 4th place in Rally Sliven and 6th place in Rally Serbia. At the end of the year is sixth in the overall standings of the Bulgarian Rally Championship and third in the European Rally Cup - East.

2008

In 2008 Todor Slavov and his co-driver Dobromir Filipov won the title in group A and Class A7 in the Bulgarian championship, for the first time in his career, completing the podium in round National Championship - Rally Sliven. At the end of the year, both are fourth in the overall standings of the Bulgarian Rally Championship. He is first Bulgarian driver who drove in European shoot-out of Pirelli Star Driver.

2009

In 2009 once again compete with the Renault Clio R3, but it is already a modification Maxi. Bulbet team decided to take part in the European rally championship in the category of two wheel drive cars. At the end of the year he is vice-champion, having achieved three wins in the rallies - Mille Miglia (Italy), Ina-Delta (Croatia) and Automobile and Touring Club of Greece (ELPA, Greece). In Greek race Slavov finished for first time on podium in European rally championship.

He drove again in European shoot-out of Pirelli Star Driver.

2010

In 2010 Todor Slavov will continue to participate in Renault Clio R3 Maxi. He submitted an application to participate in Junior World Rally Championship, they will take part in 5 of 6 races - in Turkey, Bulgaria, Germany, France and Spain.

WRC results

JWRC results

References

External links
 BULBET Racing Team - Official site

1984 births
2015 deaths
European Rally Championship drivers
Bulgarian racing drivers
Sportspeople from Varna, Bulgaria
Racing drivers who died while racing
Accidental deaths in Bulgaria